Saraswat Vidyalaya is an educational institution located in Mapusa, Goa. It was founded in March 1911 by the Saraswat Education Society that looks after the high school with the feeder units of pre-primary and primary, also has Purushottam Walawalkar Higher Secondary School of Arts, Science, Commerce and College of Commerce.

In June 1984, the society has established Swar-Shrungar, a music school where tabla, harmonium, flute and vocal music are taught.

Besides the general streams, the higher secondary manages vocational courses in Auto Engineering Technology, Office Secretaryship/Stenography and Accountancy and Auditing, Floriculture and Landscaping.

From June 1990, the management has established an Institute of Management and Human Resources Development that conducts short term job oriented courses. A new study center of Yeshwantrao Chavan Maharashtra Open University has also been added with the four year degree course in Horticulture.

From June 2000 B.B.A degree course has been started that caters to the needs of youth from North Goa.

References

External links 
 Website of the college.

Education in North Goa district
Educational institutions established in 1911
1911 establishments in India
High schools and secondary schools in Goa